Herbert Buhtz (12 April 1911 – 7 June 2006) was a German rower who competed in the 1932 Summer Olympics.

Buhtz was born in Koblenz. He became a sculler with Berliner RC. In 1932 he won the Diamond Challenge Sculls at Henley Royal Regatta beating Gerhard Boetzelen in the final. Later in the year he partnered Boetzelen to win the silver medal in the double sculls competition rowing at the 1932 Summer Olympics. In 1934 he won the Diamond Challenge Sculls at Henley again.

Buhtz was a dentist. He died in Berlin at the age of 95.

References

External links
 profile

1911 births
2006 deaths
Olympic rowers of Germany
Rowers at the 1932 Summer Olympics
Olympic silver medalists for Germany
Olympic medalists in rowing
German male rowers
Medalists at the 1932 Summer Olympics
German dentists
European Rowing Championships medalists
20th-century dentists
Sportspeople from Koblenz